Melanopsidium is a genus of flowering plants belonging to the family Rubiaceae.

Its native range is Eastern Brazil.

Species:
 Melanopsidium nigrum Colla

References

Rubiaceae
Rubiaceae genera